Dara O'Hagan (born 29 August 1964) is an Irish republican activist and former politician in Northern Ireland. She was elected in 1998 to the Northern Ireland Assembly as a Sinn Féin member for Upper Bann.

O'Hagan has obtained a BA (Hons) Combined Humanities (History and Politics) from the University of Ulster and an MSc in Irish Politics and a PhD from Queens University, Belfast. Her father was prominent republican J. B. O'Hagan.

References

1964 births
Living people
Sinn Féin MLAs
Northern Ireland MLAs 1998–2003
Councillors in Northern Ireland
Female members of the Northern Ireland Assembly
20th-century women politicians from Northern Ireland
Sinn Féin parliamentary candidates
Women councillors in Northern Ireland